Computers for Africa may refer to:
Computer technology for developing areas
Computers for African Schools
"Computers 4 Africa" project of Digital Pipeline.